The Missa solemnis in C minor, K. 139/47a, is a mass composed by Wolfgang Amadeus Mozart in the summer of 1768 in Vienna. It is scored for SATB soloists, SATB choir, violin I and II, 2 violas, 2 oboes, 2 trumpets, 2 clarini (high trumpets), 3 trombones colla parte, timpani and basso continuo.

Background
The mass was commissioned by the Jesuit priest Father Ignaz Parhammer, who asked Mozart for music for the consecration of the new Orphanage Church –  – on the Rennweg. The commission gives the mass its nickname  (Orphanage Mass). Mozart also composed a trumpet concerto suitable for performance by a boy as well as an offertory, both thought to be lost. Indeed, due to cataloging errors, this mass was also considered lost for many years.

The first performance took place on 7 December 1768 at the church, in the presence of the court. The twelve-year-old Mozart conducted a choir of orphans in a performance that received "universal acclaim and admiration". This mass is considered Mozart's most ambitious work to be performed up until that point in time, and was his first and longest missa longa.

Structure
The mass consists of six movements. Performances require approximately 40 minutes.

Despite its designation as a C minor mass, the music is predominantly in C major; masses wholly set in a minor key were considered unusual and funereal in the classical period.

References

External links
 
 
 

Masses by Wolfgang Amadeus Mozart
1768 compositions
Compositions in C minor